Ramón Gregorio Abeledo (born 29 April 1937) is an Argentine football midfielder who played for Argentina in the 1962 FIFA World Cup. He also played for Club Atlético Independiente.

References

External links

1937 births
Argentine footballers
Argentina international footballers
Association football midfielders
Club Atlético Independiente footballers
1962 FIFA World Cup players
Living people